Music FM Radio Guangdong, which uses the moniker "Music FM", is a music radio station on 99.3 FM in Guangzhou, Guangdong, China.  It is owned by Radio Guangdong, a part of Guangdong Radio and Television.

History

The station was founded in December 1980 as the first stereo FM outlet in mainland China.

Frequencies

FM
 (Pearl River Delta)
 (Meizhou)
 (Guangzhou, Xinjiang)
 (Shaoguan)

AM
 (Heyuan)
 (Chaozhou, Huizhou, Shantou)
 (Shenzhen)
 (Jiangmen)

External links
  

Chinese-language radio stations
Mandarin-language radio stations
Cantonese-language radio stations
Radio stations in China
Mass media in Guangzhou